Major-General Sir Oliver Stewart Wood Nugent,  (9 November 1860 – 31 May 1926) was a British Army officer known for his command of the 36th (Ulster) Division during the First World War and particularly at the Battle of the Somme.

Military career
He was the son of Major General St George Nugent and Emily, daughter of the Right Honourable Edward Litton, who was a senior Irish judge and MP for Coleraine at Westminster.

Nugent was educated at Harrow and Sandhurst before joining the British Army when he was commissioned into the Royal Munster Fusiliers as a lieutenant on 29 July 1882. Transferring in April 1883 to the King's Royal Rifle Corps, he was promoted to captain on 15 October 1890 and served in the Hazara, Miranzai (where he was mentioned in dispatches) and Chitral expeditions, being mentioned in dispatches again and being awarded the Distinguished Service Order (DSO). Promoted to major on 21 October 1899, he then served in the Second Boer War where he was wounded and taken prisoner at the battle of Talana Hill.

After his return to the United Kingdom, he was on 19 October 1902 appointed deputy assistant quartermaster general to the 3rd Army Corps, stationed in Ireland. The First World War saw him serving in England until 1915 when he was appointed to command the 41st Brigade (part of the 14th (Light) Division) on the Western Front. In September 1915 he was appointed to command the 36th (Ulster) Division with which he served until 1918. He was promoted to major-general 1 January 1916.

Nugent devised the strategy that led to the Ulster Division going 'over the top' twenty minutes before Zero Hour. This allowed his soldiers to get the advantage and capture the main objective of the Schwaben Redoubt. However, along the rest of the line, the attack faltered and this caused the 36th Division to withdraw. He was appointed a Companion of the Order of the Bath in the New Year Honours 1917.

He commanded the Meerut Division in India from August 1918 to 1920, and retired in 1920 to the family estate in Farren Connell, County Cavan, where he died from pneumonia on 31 May 1926. He was knighted in the New Year Honours 1922. 
Nugent's portrait by William Conor is in Belfast City Hall.

References

Bibliography

External links
Somme hero's 'lost' medals go on display, The Newsletter
Somme hero's 'lost' medals go on display, Ulster Gazette
Art UK Nugent's portrait in Belfast City Hall

1860 births
1926 deaths
Deaths from pneumonia in the Republic of Ireland
Military personnel from County Cavan
British Army major generals
People educated at Harrow School
People from County Cavan
Graduates of the Royal Military College, Sandhurst
British Army generals of World War I
Irish people of World War I
Royal Munster Fusiliers officers
King's Royal Rifle Corps officers
British military personnel of the Chitral Expedition
British Army personnel of the Second Boer War
British prisoners of war of the Second Boer War
Companions of the Distinguished Service Order
Knights Commander of the Order of the Bath
Royal Irish Fusiliers officers
Recipients of the Croix de Guerre 1914–1918 (France)
British military personnel of the Hazara Expedition of 1888